Pleasant Hill is a census-designated place and unincorporated community located in DeSoto County, Mississippi, United States, located approximately  southwest of Hernando and  southeast of Eudora, just east of Arkabutla Lake.

Pleasant Hill was formerly incorporated, and was home to several stores, two churches, and a Masonic lodge.

A post office operated under the name Pleasant Hill from 1848 to 1917.

It was first named as a CDP in the 2020 Census which listed a population of 1,863.

Demographics

2020 census

Note: the US Census treats Hispanic/Latino as an ethnic category. This table excludes Latinos from the racial categories and assigns them to a separate category. Hispanics/Latinos can be of any race.

References

Unincorporated communities in DeSoto County, Mississippi
Unincorporated communities in Mississippi
Memphis metropolitan area
Census-designated places in DeSoto County, Mississippi